The following is the list of Ambassadors and High Commissioners to Malaysia. High Commissioners represent member states of the Commonwealth of Nations and ambassadors represent other states. Note that some diplomats are accredited by, or to, more than one country. They are styled as "Tuan Yang Terutama" which is loosely translated as His Excellency.

Current ambassadors

See also
 Foreign relations of Malaysia
 List of diplomatic missions in Malaysia

References

 
Malaysia